The Northern United States, commonly referred to as the American North, the Northern States, or simply the North, is a geographical or historical region of the United States.

History

Early history
Before the 19th century westward expansion, the "Northern United States" corresponded to the present day New England region. By the 1830s it corresponded to the present day Northeast and Great Lakes region.

Before 1865, the North was distinguished from the South on the issue of slavery. In Southern states, slavery was legal until the ratification of the 13th Amendment in 1865. Northern states had all passed some form of legislation to abolish slavery by 1804. However, abolition did not mean freedom for some existing slaves. Due to gradual abolition laws, slaves would still appear in some Northern states as far as the 1840 United States Census. New Jersey was the last Northern state to end slavery. Due to their states gradual abolition laws, slavery came to an end in New Jersey when the 13th Amendment was ratified in 1865.

American Civil War

During the American Civil War (1861–1865), the Northern states comprised the U.S. states that supported the United States of America (the Union states). In this context, "The North" is synonymous with "the Union," while "The South" refers to the states that seceded from the U.S. in order to form the Confederate States of America.

There is, however, some historical disagreement as to exactly which states comprised "The North" in the context of the Civil War as five slave-holding states remained with the Union: the border states of Missouri, Kentucky, West Virginia, Maryland, and Delaware, alongside the disputed Indian Territory; depending on the source, these states and territories may be included in either region.

Geography
Geographically, the term includes the U.S. states and regions of the United States of America that are located across the northernmost part of the country. It includes states along the Canada–United States border.

Census Bureau
The United States Census Bureau divides some of the northernmost United States into the Midwest Region and the Northeast Region. The U.S. Census Bureau also includes the northernmost states of the Northwest, that are within the West Region.

Urban centers
Among the larger cities by population in the Northern United States are: New York City, Chicago, Philadelphia, Boston, Pittsburgh, Columbus, Indianapolis, Cleveland, Cincinnati, Minneapolis, St. Paul, Buffalo, Milwaukee, Detroit, and Des Moines.

The Northern United States also comprises most of the Northeast megalopolis, which is the most populated and urbanized megalopolis in the United States. The Great Lakes megalopolis is also located in the Northern United States, largely in the Great Lakes region and Midwest.

Climate
The Northern United States has a humid continental climate. The Northern United states mostly gets large amounts of snow during the winter.

See also
Northern Tier (United States)
Flora of the Northern United States
Southern United States
Southeastern United States
Southwestern United States
Yankee

References

Regions of the United States
Articles containing video clips
Northeastern United States
Midwestern United States